James Michael Kettleborough (born 22 October 1992) is an English cricketer who most recently played for Glamorgan.

Biography

Born in Huntingdon and educated at Bedford School. An opening batsman who previously played for Bedfordshire and Northamptonshire. He made his first-class debut in Northamptonshire's four-day match against the touring Sri Lanka side on 5–8 June 2014. He played 8 more matches for the county that year, before moving to Glamorgan for the start of the 2015 season.

References

External links
 

1992 births
Living people
English cricketers
Bedfordshire cricketers
Glamorgan cricketers
Northamptonshire cricketers
Derbyshire cricketers
People educated at Bedford School
People from Huntingdon
English cricketers of the 21st century